Jeffrey Ford (born February 16, 1968) is an American film editor. He was nominated for an ACE Eddie Award for Best Edited Film - Musical or Comedy for The Family Stone and for a Golden Satellite Award for Best Film Editing for One Hour Photo.

Career
While working on some of the films set in the Marvel Cinematic Universe, Ford came up with the idea to include Robert Downey Jr.'s line of "And I... am... Iron Man." at the end of Avengers: Endgame.

In 2022, Ford would provided the vocal effects of Man-Thing in the Marvel Cinematic Universe special Werewolf by Night which aired on Disney+.

Filmography

Television

Crew work

References

External links
 

American Cinema Editors
American film editors
Living people
1968 births